William Docker Browning (May 19, 1931 – February 26, 2008) was an American attorney and jurist who served as a United States district judge of the United States District Court for the District of Arizona.

Early life and education

Born in Tucson, Arizona, Browning received a Bachelor of Science degree and Bachelor of Arts degree from the University of Arizona in 1954 and was a United States Air Force Lieutenant from 1954 to 1957. He received a Bachelor of Laws from the University of Arizona College of Law in 1960.

Career 
After earning his law degree, Browning entered private practice in Tucson from 1960 to 1984.

On April 4, 1984, Browning was nominated by President Ronald Reagan to a seat on the United States District Court for the District of Arizona vacated by Judge Mary Anne Richey. He was confirmed by the United States Senate on April 24, 1984, and received his commission on May 3, 1984. He served as Chief Judge from 1990 to 1994. He assumed senior status on May 14, 1998. Browning served in that capacity until his death, in 2008.

References

Sources
 

1931 births
2008 deaths
Judges of the United States District Court for the District of Arizona
United States district court judges appointed by Ronald Reagan
20th-century American judges
University of Arizona alumni
James E. Rogers College of Law alumni
United States Air Force officers
Lawyers from Tucson, Arizona